

Events
Facing a shortage of "soldiers" and other low level members, New York's Five Families begin actively recruiting members after a twenty-year hiatus.
Salvatore Bonanno, the son of mafia boss Joseph Bonanno, becomes a "made man" and an official member of the Bonanno crime family.
February 9 – In Sicily, the bandit Gaspare Pisciotta dies in his cell from strychnine poisoning while on trial. Pisciotta had claimed that he killed his companion and separatist Salvatore Giuliano on orders from Mario Scelba, then Italian Minister of the Interior.
March 25 – Joe Adonis is convicted of perjury and sentenced to two years in a federal penitentiary. Facing a deportation order from 1954, Adonis offers to leave the country voluntarily while the verdict is under appeal as an alternative to jail time.
March 27 – Johnny Dio is convicted on charges of evading New York state income taxes, and sentenced to 60 days in prison.
 April 11 – The Rome daily newspaper Avanti! publishes a photograph of a candy factory in Palermo under the headline "Textiles and Sweets on the Drug Route."  The factory was reportedly set up by Calogero Vizzini and Italian-American gangster Lucky Luciano in 1949. In the evening after the story is published, the factory closes and the laboratory's chemists are reportedly smuggled out of the country. Police suspected that the factory was a cover for heroin trafficking.
July 10 – Calogero Vizzini the Mafia boss of Villalba in Sicily, dies. Vizzini was considered to be one of the most influential Mafia bosses of Sicily after World War II. Thousands of peasants dressed in black, politicians, and priests would take part in his funeral.  Attendees would include Mussomeli boss Giuseppe Genco Russo and the powerful boss Don Francesco Paolo Bontade from Palermo (the father of future Mafia boss Stefano Bontade) – who was one of the pallbearers. An elegy for Vizzini would be pinned to the church door. It read: "Humble with the humble. Great with the great. He showed with words and deeds that his Mafia was not criminal. It stood for respect for the law, defence of all rights, greatness of character: it was love."
July–December – According to FBI reports, several meetings between Mafia leaders are observed in Los Angeles, California, Chicago, Illinois and Mountainside, New Jersey.

Arts and literature
On the Waterfront (film)  starring Marlon Brando.

Births
Joaquin Guzman-Loera – Mexican drug baron

Deaths
Calogero Vizzini, Sicilian mafiosi

References

Organized crime
Years in organized crime